Max Walker (born December 30, 1986) is a Canadian actor. He played Gary "Squib" Furlong on the Canadian television show, 15/Love.

When not acting Walker writes and directs his own films. He currently studies at the Mel Hoppenheim School of Cinema in Montreal, Quebec.

Walker graduated from Riverdale High School in Montreal in 2004.

He starred in the 2009 French film Taking the Plunge 2 as Nick Saxton, an American swimmer in the World Junior Championships held in Quebec.

External links

Max Walker's MySpace

1986 births
Living people
Anglophone Quebec people
Canadian male television actors
Male actors from Montreal
21st-century Canadian male actors
20th-century Canadian male actors
Canadian male child actors